Rhymes for Young Ghouls is a 2013 Canadian independent drama film and the feature-film debut of writer-director Jeff Barnaby. Set in 1976 on the fictional Red Crow Mi'kmaq reservation, it takes place in the context of the Canadian residential school system.

Although it tells the fictional story of a teenager named Aila and her plot for revenge, it is based on the history of abuse of the First Nations people by government agents, including a large number of reported cases of the mental and physical abuse of residential school children. It is presented from the perspective of a teenage girl.

Plot
The film opens with a brief prologue explaining the history of Canadian First Nations children being compelled by law to attend Indian residential schools. In 1969, the prepubescent Aila (Miika Whiskeyjack) lives with her father Joseph (Glen Gould), mother Anna (Roseanne Supernault) and younger brother Tyler at the fictional Red Crow Indian Reservation, a Mi'kmaq Indian reserve. Aila's parents consume drugs and alcohol to cope with the abuse they suffered at St. Dymphna's residential school. Tyler is accidentally killed by Anna during a drunk driving accident. The grief-stricken Anna commits suicide while Joseph takes the blame and is imprisoned.

The film fast forwards seven years later to 1976. In her father's absence, the now-teenage Aila (Kawennáhere Devery Jacobs) takes over her father's drug dealing business in the care of her uncle Burner (Brandon Oakes), who himself consumes and sells drugs. To avoid being sent to St. Dymphna's school, Aila uses the proceeds from the drug money to bribe the corrupt and abusive Indian agent Popper (Mark Antony Krupa), who runs the school. In flashback scenes, it is show that a younger Popper (Sheamas Graham) was bullied by several Mi'kmaq youths including Burner. A younger Joseph (Muin Gould) comes to his aid but Popper spurns his offer of friendship and develops a hatred for the Indians in the reserve.

One day, Aila's drug money is stolen. Her predicament is complicated when her father Joseph is released from prison and returns to the Red Crow Reserve. Relations between daughter and father are initially frayed; Aila resents her father for not being there, while Joseph is unhappy that his daughter is involved in the drug business. Aila and three friends later hatch a plot to break into St. Dymphna's with the assistance of one of the resident boys, Jujijj (Shako Mattawa Jacobs), and steal the required money. However, Burner betrays them to Popper, who arrests Joseph on trumped up property damage charges and sends Aila to St. Dymphna's.

During her induction, Aila is shorn of her long braids and imprisoned in a cell. However, she is freed by a local resident boy. Seeking revenge against Popper, Aila and her friends don Halloween costumes and break into St Dymphna's. They free Joseph and steal C$ 20,000 from Popper's office. After escaping, Aila reconciles with her father, who tells her that she is not to blame for the death of her mother and the cycle of abuse that occurred at St Dymphna's.

However, Popper catches up with them and knocks Joseph down with a rifle butt. Popper attempts to rape Aila but is shot dead by the local resident boy who freed Aila. To protect the young boy and his daughter, Joseph takes the fall for killing Popper. Gisigu (Stewart Myiow), a friend of her grandfather, becomes her mentor and promises to help steer her away from dealing with drugs. Aila also befriends the young boy who saved her and her dad from Popper.

Cast
The cast of the film includes:

Production
Prospector Films of Montreal produced the film, which was shot from 21 October to 22 November 2012.

Release and reception
Rhymes for Young Ghouls had its world premiere at the Toronto International Film Festival on 9 September 2013. Its first theatrical release was on 31 January 2014 in Toronto.

The film has inspired the creation of The Aila Test, a litmus test used to analyze representation of indigenous female characters.

Awards

References

External links
 Official website
 
 
 
 
 

2013 films
2013 directorial debut films
2013 drama films
2013 independent films
Mi'kmaq-language films
Canadian Film Centre films
Canadian independent films
Canadian teen drama films
English-language Canadian films
Films directed by Jeff Barnaby
Films set in 1969
Films set in 1976
Works about residential schools in Canada
2010s Canadian films